Alfred James Witzell (April 26, 1879 – July 31, 1964), was a Canadian politician. He served in the Legislative Assembly of New Brunswick from 1912 to 1917 as an independent member. He died in 1964.

References 

1879 births
1964 deaths